Kabacan officially the Municipality of Kabacan (Maguindanaon: Inged nu Kabakan, Jawi: ايڠايد نو كابكن; Iranun: Inged a Kabacan, ايڠايد ا كابكن; ; ;), is a 1st class municipality in the province of Cotabato, Philippines. According to the 2020 census, it has a population of 77,164 people.

The town is predominantly composed of rice farms made possible by the influx of Ilocano-speaking people from northern Philippines. The University of Southern Mindanao is in Kabacan. It is strategically located between the cities of Cotabato and Davao from west to east and the cities of Cagayan de Oro and Iligan from the north and General Santos from the south.

History
Kabacan got its name from the word “ka-abacan” which means the source of abundance. People from far-flung barangays used to come to this place and, upon returning home, they brought with them many commodities of their livelihood.

The municipality of Kabacan was a barrio of the municipal district of Pikit before its creation as a district political body. It was created as a regular municipality by virtue of Executive Order No. 82 dated August 18, 1947, issued by President Manuel Roxas of the Republic of the Philippines.

Growth was gradual under the domain of Datu Mantawil; that influx of settlers from Luzon and Visayas arrived in the 1930s. This was made so when the McLareen family sold its hacienda to Jose Yulo Alano, Rafael Alunan and party who organize a company under the cooperate name of Rio Grande Estate. The company became the people's place of business and social center. Recognizing his immense power and leadership over the area, the provincial governor of Cotabato organizes the Kabacan into a Municipal District with Datu Mantawil its first mayor in 1935.

World War II 
After the Japanese landing on Davao, the Miura Detachment then proceeded to advance towards Kabacan but had to struggle fighting the remaining Filipino-American resistance. Soon, they succeed in capturing Kabacan on May 3, 1942.

The Rio Grande Rubber Estate was sold by the Filipino Incorporators to the Japanese Imperial Government. It became the site for the provisional municipal government with Cenon Doctolero as the appointed mayor. The Japanese garrison was attacked October 25, 1942, by guerrilla forces under U.S. Lieut. Col. Wendell Fertig. During a fourteen-day siege sixty-eight of the seventy-six Japanese garrison were killed. Only the arrival of reinforcements saved the garrison and caused the guerrillas to withdraw.

Currently, Kabacan is known as an Ilocano-speaking area since 65% of its population are Ilocano immigrants.

Geography
Kabacan is centrally located in Cotabato province, bounded on the north by Pres. Roxas, on the east by Matalam, on the south by M'lang, and on the west by Carmen, Cotabato and Datu Montawal.

The landscape is characterized by almost regular landscape of flat terrain. The high mountains and rolling hills leaping close to the river plus the narrow plains have varied topographical features. Other features are moderately sloping and strongly sloping.

Bodies of Water
The Kabacan River is a tributary of the Pulangi River, discharging at Kayaga Kabacan, Cotabato.

Barangays
Kabacan is politically subdivided into 24 barangays.

Note

Climate

Type B climate prevails in the municipality. It is characterized by dry season for one to three months with less than 76 millimeters or more rainfall per month throughout the year. The wettest month has more than three times the rainfall of the driest month. This type of climate is conducive to intensive rice cultivation and plantings of bananas and other fruit trees.

Demographics

Economy

Commercial activities are in the Public Market and along the National Highway and USM Avenue. Kabacan serve as a business and trading center for the adjacent municipalities of Carmen, Pagagawan, Pikit and Matalam. The majority of the commercial establishments are engaged in general merchandising, sari-sari and dry goods. One big shopping center and drug store owned by a big company are along the National Highway. There are four banks and three gasoline stations.

Other small-scale industries are electronics and repair shop, car/motor vehicle body builder/repair shop, vulcanizing and machine shop, shoe and appliance repair shops hollow blocks/culvert making basket/mat weaving, dressmaking/tailoring, balut making, bakery and Mascovado factory in Barangay Malanduage.

Natural resources
Primarily agricultural crops include corn, rice, soybeans, peanut, mongo, cassava and other field crops. This town is popularly known as the "Rice Production Center", the "Rice Granary of the Province of Cotabato". Its populace has devoted most of its fertile domain to rice production. Corn is the secondary crop of this town.

Education

Colleges and universities

University of Southern Mindanao
St. Luke's Institute
Asian Colleges and Technological Institute

High school

Public:
Kabacan National High School-Main Campus
Osias High School
Nangaan High School
Gil Manalo High School
Bannawag National High School

Private:
University Laboratory School (science-curriculum based High School located in the University of Southern Mindanao)
St. Luke's Institute
Kabacan Wesleyan Academy
Asian Colleges and Technological Institute
Notre Dame of Kabacan, Inc.
Berean Christian School

Elementary

Public:
Kabacan Pilot Central School
Katidtuan Central Elementary School
Osias Elementary School
USM Annex Elementary School
Lower Paatan Elementary School
Upper Paatan Elementary School
Cuyapon Elementary School
Kilagasan Elementary School
Dona Josefa E Marcos Elementary School

Private:
Enhanced Childhood Learning Center, Inc.
DD Clemente Academy-Montessori
Kabacan Wesleyan Academy
Notre Dame of Kabacan, Inc.
Berean Christian School

Tourism
Pisan Cave at Pisan, Kabacan.
Waterfalls and spring at Tamped, Kabacan
Nangaan Cliff at Nangaan, Kabacan
Nangaan Caves and Waterfalls
Kabuling Waterfalls at Simbuhay, Kabacan
Simbuhay Waterfalls at Simbuhay, Kabacan
Matibuhaw Cave at Simbuhay, Kabacan
Kalasan Waterfalls at Pedtad, Kabacan
Crocodile Farm at Cuyapon, Kabacan
Garagan Spring Resort at Katidtuan, Kabacan
University of Southern Mindanao located at Kabacan town proper. A State University with research and training centers, open amphitheaters, sports facilities and pilot agricultural projects.
Waterland Resort at Osias, Kabacan

References

External links
 Kabacan Profile at the DTI Cities and Municipalities Competitive Index
 [ Philippine Standard Geographic Code]
 Local Governance Performance Management System

Municipalities of Cotabato
Populated places on the Rio Grande de Mindanao
Establishments by Philippine executive order